The 1904–05 Army Cadets men's ice hockey season was the 2nd season of play for the program.

Season
In Army's second season the team played its first intercollegiate game, albeit against a very short-lived team.

Roster

Standings

Schedule and results

|-
!colspan=12 style=";" | Regular Season

References

Army Black Knights men's ice hockey seasons
Army
Army
Army
Army